A hudo is a temporary pit toilet in a camp, covered with a tarpaulin, not a permanent outhouse. The name is in common use in Dutch and Belgian Scouting, and has international usage.

Etymology
The word hudo is derived from the Urdu word howdah, which is the covered carriage on elephants.

Other popular etymological explanations include the acronym of houd uw darmen open (the Dutch parallel to "kybo", "keep your bowels open"), and the contraction of hurkdoos (Dutch for "squat loo"). The validity of these explanations is questioned.

See also
 
 Scouting Nederland
 3rd World Scout Jamboree

References

Toilets
Scouting and Guiding in the Netherlands
Scouting and Guiding in Belgium